Luis Valendi Odelus (born 1 December 1994) is a Haitian football player who currently plays for Don Bosco.

References

External links

1994 births
Living people
Haitian footballers
Association football goalkeepers
Aigle Noir AC players
Ligue Haïtienne players
People from Nord-Ouest (department)
Copa América Centenario players